Mera Aangan is a Pakistani television soap opera which aired on ARY Digital. First episode was aired on 9 January 2017.

Cast
Fatima Effendi as Mairah
Syed Mohsin Gilani as Sajjad
Gul-e-Rana as Samina
Furqan Qureshi as Armaan
Abdullah Ejaz as Shahvair
Huma Nawab as Shaista
Faizan Shaikh/Saqlain Bashir as Furqan
Tabassum Arif as Zubaida
Sheharyar Zaidi as Irshad
Sajid Shah as Faraz
Tabrez Shah as Zameer
Esha Noor as Neelam
Iqra Faiz as Alishba
Rabya Kulsoom as Natasha
Farah Nadeem as Shehzeen
Sundas Gulzar as Neha

References

2017 Pakistani television series debuts
2017 Pakistani television series endings